Troy Township is one of the eighteen townships of Richland County, Ohio, United States.  It is a part of the Mansfield Metropolitan Statistical Area.  The 2000 census found 6,449 people in the township, 2,403 of whom lived in the unincorporated portions of the township.

Geography
Located in the southwestern part of the county, it borders the following townships:
Springfield Township - north
Madison Township - northeast corner
Washington Township - east
Jefferson Township - southeast corner
Perry Township - south
Perry Township, Morrow County - southwest corner
Troy Township, Morrow County - southwest
North Bloomfield Township, Morrow County - west corner
Sandusky Township - northwest

The village of Lexington is located in eastern Troy Township.

Name and history
It is one of seven Troy Townships statewide.

Government
The township is governed by a three-member board of trustees, who are elected in November of odd-numbered years to a four-year term beginning on the following January 1. Two are elected in the year after the presidential election and one is elected in the year before it. There is also an elected township fiscal officer, who serves a four-year term beginning on April 1 of the year after the election, which is held in November of the year before the presidential election. Vacancies in the fiscal officership or on the board of trustees are filled by the remaining trustees.

Law enforcement in Troy Township is carried out by the Richland County Sheriff's Office, while fire protection and emergency medical services are the responsibility of the Troy Township Fire Department.

References

External links
County website
Township fire department

Townships in Richland County, Ohio
Townships in Ohio